Sancho is an Iberian name of Basque origin.

Sancho may also refer to:
 Sancho (horse), a British Thoroughbred racehorse
 Sancho, West Virginia
 Mu Arae e, an extrasolar planet
 Sancho (spice), a culinary spice used in Korea made from Zanthoxylum schinifolium
 Jadon Sancho, an English Footballer